Pia Mechler is a German born actress, director and author.

Mechler studied acting at the European Film College in Denmark. She graduated in 2005 with a diploma. After graduating Mechler moved to Berlin. There she also worked with the drama teacher  Kristiane Kupfer and attended workshops in voice training.
She was part of the Portuguese electro pop band MAU and was signed with Universal Portugal. They released their debut album "Man And Unable".

Mechler starred from 2004 initially in several short films. As of 2005 she appeared in English and German television and film productions. In 2008 played in the two-part film adaptation of Terry Pratchett's Discworld. 2009 in the  RTL disaster movie . In 2010 she starred in the Student-Oscar nominated movie The Night Father Christmas Died.

She is also the creator, director and star of the web series Almost Settled. The comedy about two European expats in NYC got released in 2015.

Mechler first appearance in an American feature film, You Above All (originally titled The Movie), is scheduled to be released in 2016. The film is directed by Edgar Morais and Lucas Elliot Eber and starring Edgar Morais and Olivia Thirlby.

She directed the comedy Everything is Wonderful, starring Bondgirl Tonia Sotiropoulou and herself.

In 2015 Pia Mechler first novel "Remisuri" got published by the German publishing house Shelff.

 Filmography 

 Devils (2020)
 You Above All (filming)
 2018: Red Dead Redemption 2 (as Local Population)
 2017: Everything Is Wonderful (as Lena)
 2015: Almost Settled (as Actress, Writer, and Producer)
 2015: Süsser September (as Jennifer)
 2015: Letzte Spur Berlin (TV Series; as Selma Thorvald)
 2013: Morden im Norden (TV Series; as Anna Bruns)
 2012: Work (Short; as Katharine Underwood Johnson)
 2012: Um Himmels Willen (TV Series; as Ingrid Meisel)
 2011: The Big Black (as Sandy)
 2010: The Night Father Christmas Died (Short; as Sascha)
 2009: Contra (Short; as Eclipse)
 2009:  (TV Movie; as Nadine Schöngau)
 2009: Ein starkes Team (TV Series; as Jessica Pohl)
 2009: Invisible Eyes (as Gaby
 2008: The Color of Magic (TV Mini-Series; as Weems)
 2005: Das geheime Leben der Spielerfrauen (TV Series; as Steffie)
 2004: Bad Beat Boys (Short; as Girl in the video)
 2004: Five to Six (Short; as Dishwasher)

 See also You Above All''

References

Further reading

External links 
 

21st-century German actresses
German film actresses
Mass media people from Darmstadt
German television actresses
German women writers
German women film directors
Living people
Actors from Darmstadt
Year of birth missing (living people)